Ron Ostrow is an American actor who mostly appears on television. His first major credit was in the Aaron Sorkin movie A Few Good Men in 1992, where he played an MP.  He was in the original stage version playing the role of The Sentry. He has since made appearances in many other Sorkin projects, including Sports Night, The West Wing, Studio 60 on the Sunset Strip and The Newsroom. He has also featured in guest and recurring roles on a number of other television series, including Law & Order, Party of Five, Fired Up, Star Trek: Voyager, Ally McBeal, Boston Legal and Scandal, as well as the films Charlie Wilson's War and The Incredible Burt Wonderstone.

Filmography

Cadillac Man (1990) as Police Officer (uncredited)
Law & Order (1991–1994, TV Series) as CSU Tech #1 / Whalen
A Few Good Men (1992) as M.P.
Quiz Show (1994) as Photographer (uncredited)
The Jerky Boys (1995) as Fast Food Family Man
General Hospital (1996–2008, TV Series) as Pilot / Dr. Austin / Quartermaine's Pilot
Party of Five (1997, TV Series) as Minister
Port Charles (1997, TV Series) as A. D. A.
Fired Up (1997–1998, TV Series) as Johnny / Man #3 / Bear #1
Tracey Takes On... (1998, TV Series) as Photographer
Star Trek: Voyager (1998, TV Series) as Borg Drone
Bulworth (1998) as Staff Member
The Rat Pack (1998, TV Movie) as Studio Head
Sports Night (1998–2000, TV Series) as Will
The Norm Show (2000–2001, TV Series) as Man
Ally McBeal (2001, TV Series) as Attorney Martin Fixx
Grounded for Life (2001, TV Series) as Timothy
Unsolved Mysteries (2002, TV Series documentary) as Fred's Lawyer
Firefly (2002, TV Series) as Commander
The West Wing (2002–2005, TV Series) as Reporter John / John / John - Reporter #5
Mister Sterling (2003, TV Series) as Governor's Aide #2
Scrubs (2003, TV Series) as Mr. Foster
Yes, Dear (2003, TV Series) as Doctor
A Minute with Stan Hooper (2003, TV Series) as Townsperson
What I Like About You (2003, TV Series) as Minister
2010: A Kitchen Odyssey (2005)
Boston Legal (2005–2007, TV Series) as Attorney Cone
Studio 60 on the Sunset Strip (2006, TV Series) as Richard
Women of a Certain Age (2006, TV Movie) as Danny Shrier
The Nine (2006–2007, TV Series) as TV Reporter / Reporter #3
Charlie Wilson's War (2007) as Congressional Committee #5 (uncredited)
Dirty Sexy Money (2008, TV Series) as Reporter / Reporter #1
AmericanEast (2008) as Local news reporter
Better with You (2010–2011, TV Series) as Bar Regular #2 / Gage Attendant
The Newsroom (2012, TV Series) as Passenger #1
Scandal (2012-2013, TV Series) as Secret Service Agent / Agent Bryce / Nigel Sarnoff
Dark Skies (2013) as Richard Klein
The Incredible Burt Wonderstone (2013) as Jim the Bartender
Modern Family (2013, TV Series) as Married Man

References

External links

Living people
American male actors
Year of birth missing (living people)